Para-Vasudeva is a term found in the Vaisnavism tradition that refers to the Absolute Reality called the Supreme Brahman in Hinduism. In the Gaudiya, the Vallabha Sampradaya and the Nimbarka Sampradaya, it refers to Svayam bhagavan Krishna, the Supreme Personality of Godhead. In Sri sampradaya it refers to Vishnu. In later centuries, it was the composite of Narayana and Vasudeva. Para-Vasudeva Vishnu resides in Vaikuntha. The Lord is four armed and dwells with Goddess Lakshmi and her expansions.

Consort
Goddess Sri Lakshmi Devi, Bhudevi, Neela Devi (Nappinnai)

References

Vaishnavism
Hindu gods